Advent Bangun (born Advani Rangua; October 12, 1952 – February 10, 2018) was a 12-time Indonesian karateka champion. He gave up his career in karate pursue a career in cinema. He died on February 10, 2018, due to diabetes.

Life and career

Bangun (Rangua) became the national champion in karate in 1971 and represented Indonesia at the international level. He began his acting career in the mid-1970s, mainly due to fame and success achieved in martial arts. He appeared in many action films. After his acting career, Bangun became a pastor under the name Thomas Bangun and consequently came into prominence as a Christian activist.

Filmography

Television
 Singgasana Brama Kumbara (1996)
 Sapu jagad (2000) as Tiger

Film
 Rajawali Sakti (1976)
 Dua Pendekar Pembelah Langit (1977)
 Krakatau (1977) as Bodyguard 
 Ken arok – Ken dedes (1983) as Tunggul Ametung 
 Si Buta Lawan Jaka Sembung (1983) 
 Mawar berbisa (1984) 
 Golok setan (1984) as Banyujaga 
 Gadis berwajah seribu (1984) 
  (1984) as Handoko 
 Si buta dari gua hantu (1985) 
 Residivis (1985) 
 Putri duyung (1985) 
 Noda X (1985) 
 Komando samber nyawa (1985) 
 Gantian dong (1985) 
 Darah perjaka (1985) 
 Carok (1985) 
 Petualangan cinta nyi blorong  (1986) 
 Menumpas teroris (1986) 
 Langganan (1986) 
 Siluman srigala putih (1987) 
 Pendekar bukit tengkorak (1987) 
 Neraka perut bumi (1987) 
 Kelabang seribu (1987) 
 Siluman kera (1988) 
 Pendekar ksatria (1988) 
 Mandala penakluk satria tar tar (1988) 
 Malaikat bayangan (1988) 
 Bangkitnya Si Mata Malaikat (1988) 
 Si pahit lidah dans si mata empat (1989)
 Pembalasan si mata elang (1989) as Mata Elang 
 Buronan (1989)
 Lady Dragon (1990) as Ringo 
 Stone Age Warriors (1991)  
 Without Mercy (1995) as Tomo

References

External links
 
 Advent Bangun biography at Bahasa Indonesia

1952 births
2018 deaths
People of Batak descent
Karo people
Kyokushin kaikan practitioners
Indonesian male film actors
Indonesian male karateka
Indonesian religious leaders
Indonesian activists
Indonesian Christians
Indonesian Protestants
Indonesian Lutherans
People from North Sumatra